Stein Sund is a bass guitarist from Karmøy who was a longtime member of the Norwegian viking metal band Einherjer. 
He has several projects up and running such as Thundra, Evig Natt, and  Dwelling Souls.

References

Year of birth missing (living people)
Living people
Norwegian black metal musicians
Norwegian rock bass guitarists
Norwegian heavy metal bass guitarists
Norwegian male bass guitarists
People from Rogaland
Norwegian multi-instrumentalists